DXMS may refer to:
 DXMS-AM, an AM radio station broadcasting in Cotabato City, Philippines
 DXMS-FM, an FM radio station broadcasting in Surigao City, Philippines